Ogarkovo is a rural locality (a settlement) and the administrative center of Podlesnoye Rural Settlement, Vologodsky District, Vologda Oblast, Russia. The population was 1,400 as of 2002. There are 7 streets.

Geography 
Ogarkovo is located 13 km southeast of Vologda (the district's administrative centre) by road. Pogorelovo is the nearest rural locality.

References 

Rural localities in Vologodsky District